Lutful Haider Chowdhury was a Bangladeshi essayist, researcher of Bengali language and literature, educationist and intellectual. In 1990, the government of Bangladesh awarded him the Ekushey Padak, the state's second-highest civilian honour, for his contribution to education.

Chowdhury's elder brother, Mufazzal Haider Chaudhury, was a professor at the University of Dhaka who was killed in the Bangladesh Liberation War.

Awards 
 Ekushey Padak (1990)

References 

Bengali writers
Bangladeshi educators
People from Noakhali District
Recipients of the Ekushey Padak